Streptomyces roseoviolaceus is a bacterium species from the genus of Streptomyces which has been isolated from soil.

See also

See also 
 List of Streptomyces species

References

External links
Type strain of Streptomyces roseoviolaceus at BacDive -  the Bacterial Diversity Metadatabase	

roseoviolaceus
Bacteria described in 1958